AMG LASSO is a media recognition service launched by the All Media Guide in 2004. The LASSO service automatically recognizes CDs, DVDs, and digital audio files in formats such as MP3, WMA, and others. The service uses CD table of contents (ToC), DVD ToC, and acoustic fingerprint based recognition to recognize media. LASSO is available in versions for PCs and embedded devices. 

LASSO competes with user submitted services like freedb, Gracenote, MusicBrainz, and Discogs.

See also
List of online music databases

External links
Macrovision's LASSO Product Page (using AMG data)

Online music and lyrics databases
Acoustic fingerprinting